Elmwood is a city in Peoria County, Illinois, United States. The population was 2,097 at the 2010 census. Elmwood is part of the Peoria, Illinois Metropolitan Statistical Area.

History

The settlement is named after the mansion of William J. Phelps.

On the night of June 5, 2010, an elephant trunk tornado touched down in Elmwood, destroying city hall and other area buildings, bringing down limbs and power lines, and damaging the roof of a theater. There are plans to rebuild some of their most treasured buildings, such as the community center and city hall. Although Elmwood suffered a great deal from the tornado, many town businesses re-opened.

Geography
Elmwood is located at  (40.778378, -89.968355).

Demographics

As of the 2000 United States Census, there were 1,945 people, 772 households, and 565 families residing in the city. The racial makeup of the city was 98.71% White, 0.15% African American, 0.36% Native American, 0.15% Asian, 0.05% from other races, and 0.57% from two or more races. Hispanic or Latino of any race were 0.82% of the population.

There were 772 households, out of which 34.2% had children under the age of 18 living with them, 63.3% were married couples living together, 7.6% had a female householder with no husband present, and 26.8% were non-families. 24.6% of all households were made up of individuals, and 14.1% had someone living alone who was 65 years of age or older. The average household size was 2.50 and the average family size was 2.99.

In the city, the age distribution of the population shows 26.5% under the age of 18, 6.1% from 18 to 24, 27.8% from 25 to 44, 22.8% from 45 to 64, and 16.9% who were 65 years of age or older. The median age was 39 years. For every 100 females, there were 88.5 males. For every 100 females age 18 and over, there were 84.8 males.

The median income for a household in the city was $44,500, and the median income for a family was $51,505. Males had a median income of $37,981 versus $22,557 for females. The per capita income for the city was $19,797. About 2.4% of families and 2.8% of the population were below the poverty line, including 2.6% of those under age 18 and 3.5% of those age 65 or over.

Culture 
Elmwood is mentioned in Life and Times of Fredrick Douglass (1881); Frederick Douglass gave a lyceum lecture in early February 1871 "on one of the frostiest and coldest nights I have ever experienced."  Needing a place to stay in Peoria the following night, Elmwood citizen E.R. Brown suggested to Douglass that orator Robert J. Ingersoll "would gladly open his doors to you."  Life and Times of Fredirick Douglass, p. 536.

Notable people 

 L. R. Kershaw, Oklahoma pioneer, cattleman, and politician; born in Elmwood
 Lora Marx, sculptor; born in Elmwood
 James D. Putnam, lawyer, business, and politician; lived in Elmwood
 Lorado Taft, sculptor ("The Pioneers"), born in Elmwood
 Bill Tuttle, outfielder for the Detroit Tigers, Kansas City Athletics and Minnesota Twins; born in Cramer, which is an unincorporated community within the current Elmwood zipcode.

References

External links
 Elmwood, Illinois Official City Website

 
Cities in Illinois
Cities in Peoria County, Illinois
Peoria metropolitan area, Illinois